Little Bill is an American animated television series created by Bill Cosby. It aired on Nickelodeon and Noggin. The main character was inspired by both Cosby's childhood and by his late son, Ennis Cosby. Little Bill's catchphrase "Hello, friend!" was originally a greeting that Ennis used. The show ran for two production seasons, each containing 26 episodes (52 episodes in total).

Series overview

Episodes

Season 1 (1999–2002)
The first season has a total of 26 episodes. Most episodes are divided into two stories. The season was first announced in 1997; at first, it was planned to be a series of three specials, before it was expanded into a 26-episode season.

Season 2 (2001–04)
Like the previous season, this season has a total of 26 episodes.

References

Lists of American children's animated television series episodes
Lists of Nickelodeon television series episodes